Leti is an Indonesian island, the westernmost of the Leti Islands, and one of the 92 officially listed outlying islands of Indonesia. Leti is located in southwest Maluku province. The main town is Sewaru.

The Leti language, a member of Austronesian languages is spoken on Leti.

See also

 Islands of Indonesia
 Maluku Islands
 Maluku (province)

References

External links
 Satellite imagery from Google Maps

Islands of the Maluku Islands
Outer Banda Arc
Landforms of Maluku (province)
Populated places in Indonesia